Carlos Alberto Gianelli Derois (March 7, 1948 – September 17, 2021) was a Uruguayan lawyer and diplomat.

Gianelli was born in Montevideo. He was Uruguayan ambassador to Saudi Arabia, Mexico, the Netherlands, and the United States of America (2005–2012), and acted for Uruguay at The Hague during the Uruguay River pulp mill dispute.

On July 23, 2015, he was reappointed  Ambassador of Uruguay to the United States where he was accredited on August 3, 2015.

References

1948 births
2021 deaths
People from Montevideo
20th-century Uruguayan lawyers
Ambassadors of Uruguay to Saudi Arabia
Ambassadors of Uruguay to Mexico
Ambassadors of Uruguay to the Netherlands
Ambassadors of Uruguay to the United States
People educated at the Crandon Institute